Baldwin of Flanders usually refers to Baldwin I of Constantinople (1172–1205), Count of Flanders (as Baldwin IX) and the first Latin Emperor of Constantinople. It may also refer to:

 Baldwin I, Count of Flanders (died 879)
 Baldwin II, Count of Flanders ( 865–918)
 Baldwin III, Count of Flanders ( 940–962)
 Baldwin IV, Count of Flanders ( 980–1035)
 Baldwin V, Count of Flanders (1012–1067)
 Baldwin VI, Count of Flanders ( 1030–1070)
 Baldwin VII, Count of Flanders (1093–1119)
 Baldwin VIII, Count of Flanders (1150–1195), better known as Baldwin V, Count of Hainaut